Gerhard Kittel (23 September 1888 – 11 July 1948) was a German Lutheran theologian and lexicographer of biblical languages. He was an enthusiastic supporter of the Nazis and an open antisemite. He is known in the field of biblical studies for his  (Theological Dictionary of the New Testament).

Biography
Kittel was born on 23 September 1888 in Breslau. The son of Old Testament scholar Rudolf Kittel, he married Hanna Untermeier in 1914, but there were no children from the union. In May 1933, he joined the Nazi Party. He had had no previous involvement in politics but called the party "a völkisch renewal movement on a Christian, moral foundation".

On 3 May 1945, after Adolf Hitler's Third Reich capitulated to the Allies, Kittel was arrested by the French occupying forces. He was subsequently removed from office and interned at Balingen. In his own defence, Kittel maintained his work was "scientific in method" and motivated by Christianity, although it may have appeared antisemitic to some. He attempted to distinguish his work from the "vulgar antisemitism of Nazi propaganda" like Der Stürmer and Alfred Rosenberg, who was known for his anti-Christian rhetoric, völkisch arguments and emphasis on Lebensraum. Kittel characterized his work as an "attempt to grapple with the problem of Jewry and the Jewish question".

Martin Dibelius, a theologian at Heidelberg, wrote that Kittel's works related to ancient Judaism "are of purely scientific character" and "do not serve the Party interpretation of Judaism". He said further that Kittel deserved "the thanks of all who are interested in the scientific study of Judaism."

Claus Schedl, who attended Kittel's lectures on the Jewish Question in the winter of 1941–1942 in Vienna, said that "one heard not a single word of malice" and that "Professor Kittel truly did not collaborate". Schedl says that Kittel was one of very few scholars who promoted an opinion on the Jewish Question other than the official one. Kittel himself said his goal was to combat the myths and distortions of extremist members of the Nazi Party.

Annemarie Tugendhat was a Christian Jew whose father had been taken to the concentration camp Welzheim in 1938. She testified that Kittel had strongly objected against the actions being taken against Jews. Kittel's work on the Jewish Question was not based on the racial theories of Nazism but upon theology.

In 1946, Kittel was released pending his trial, but was forbidden to enter Tübingen until 1948. From 1946 to 1948 he was a pastor in Beuron. In 1948, he was allowed back into Tübingen, but died that year before the criminal proceedings against him could be resumed. He died on 11 July 1948.

Nazi Germany
A Professor of Evangelical Theology and New Testament at the University of Tübingen, he published studies depicting the Jewish people as the historical enemy of Germany, Christianity, and European culture in general. In a lecture of June 1933  (The Jewish Question), that soon appeared in print, he spoke for the stripping of citizenship from German Jews, their removal from medicine, law, teaching, and journalism, and to forbid marriage or sexual relations with non-Jews – thus anticipating by two years the Nazi government, which introduced its Nuremberg Racial Laws and took away Jewish rights of German citizenship in 1935. A close friend of Walter Frank, Kittel joined Frank's , a politicized organization  upon its foundation in 1935.

William F. Albright wrote that, "In view of the terrible viciousness of his attacks on Judaism and the Jews, which continues at least until 1943, Gerhard Kittel must bear the guilt of having contributed more, perhaps, than any other Christian theologian to the mass murder of Jews by Nazis."

Literary works

 , 1914
 , 1914
 , 1926
 , 1926
 , 1932
  (A theological correspondence with Karl Barth, 1934 with Karl Barth
 , 1939
  (World Jewry of Antiquity – Research on the Jewish Question), 1943 with Eugen Fischer

See also
 Walter Grundmann

References

Footnotes

Bibliography

Further reading

External links
 Gerhard Kittel by Textus Receptus

1888 births
1948 deaths
20th-century Christian biblical scholars
20th-century German male writers
20th-century German Protestant theologians
20th-century lexicographers
20th-century Lutherans
German biblical scholars
German lexicographers
German Lutheran theologians
German male non-fiction writers
Lutheran biblical scholars
Nazi Party members
New Testament scholars
People from the Province of Silesia
Writers from Wrocław
University of Kiel alumni
Academic staff of the University of Tübingen